Blunt may refer to:
 Blunt (surname), a surname (and list of people with the name)
 Blunt (cigar), a term used in the cigar industry to designate blunt-tipped, usually factory-rolled cigars
 Blunt (cannabis), a slang term used in cannabis culture
 "Blunt" (Person of Interest), an episode of the TV series Person of Interest
 Blunt, South Dakota, USA
 Blunt Peninsula, Nunavut, Canada
 Blunt Magazine, a Canadian blogging e-zine published quarterly
 Blunt (snowboard magazine), a 1990s American periodical

See also
 Blunt ends, a possible configuration of a DNA molecule
 Blunt force trauma, a type of physical trauma in medical terminology
 Blunt instrument, a category of melee weapons
 Blunted affect, a lack of emotional response in psychology
 Slide (skateboarding) for bluntslide, a skateboard trick
 Blount (disambiguation)